An aerator is a mechanical device used for aeration, or mixing air with another substance, such as water or soil.

The word aerator may also refer to:

 Faucet aerator
 Floating surface aerator, used in wastewater treatment
 Lawn aerator
 Surface or subsurface aerator, used in water aeration
 Wine aerator